Greif is a surname. Notable people with the surname include: 

 Avner Greif, American economist
 Eric Greif, lawyer and entertainment personality 
 Gideon Greif, historian
 Jean-Jacques Greif, French journalist and writer
 Mark Greif, editor
 Martin Greif, American writer
 Olivier Greif, French composer
 Stephen Greif, English actor